John Wallace (July 8, 1903 – September 21, 1990) was an American sailor. He competed in the mixed 6 metres at the 1936 Summer Olympics.

Personal life
Wallace served in the United States Navy during World War II.

References

1903 births
1990 deaths
People from Prescott, Wisconsin
Olympic sailors of the United States
American male sailors (sport)
Sailors at the 1936 Summer Olympics – 6 Metre
United States Navy personnel of World War II